James Allen Johnson (June 2, 1924 – July 20, 2016) was a major general in the United States Army who served as Commandant of the U.S. Army Engineer School at Fort Belvoir, and as Deputy Chief of Engineers.  He was awarded two Distinguished Service Medals, the Silver Star, two Legion of Merit decorations, two Bronze Star Medals, two Purple Hearts, the Air Medal, the Combat Infantryman's Badge, and the Parachute Badge.

Born in Stoughton, Wisconsin to Norwegian immigrant parents, Johnson graduated from Stoughton High School in 1942. After studying at the University of Wisconsin for one semester, he was drafted into the Army on March 12, 1943 during World War II. Johnson was subsequently appointed to the United States Military Academy and graduated with a B.S. degree after three years of study on June 3, 1947. After serving as a combat engineer in Korea, he earned an M.S. degree in industrial engineering from Stanford University in 1957. Johnson later graduated from the Army Command and General Staff College in 1961 and, after a tour of duty in Vietnam, the Industrial College of the Armed Forces in 1966. His second tour of duty in Vietnam was as commanding general of the U.S. Army Engineer Command and Director of Construction for the Military Assistance Command.

Johnson retired from active duty in August 1980 and settled in Fairfax Station, Virginia. After his death at Fort Belvoir, he was buried in the West Point Cemetery on September 26, 2016.

References

Sources
 "First Lieutenant James A. Johnson", Remembering the "Forgotten War": U.S. Army Engineer Officers in Korea, pp. 146–57.  Office of History, U.S. Army Corps of Engineers.  (Alexandria, VA: July 2004).
 "Major General James A. Johnson", Engineer Profiles.  Charles Hendricks, interviewer. Office of History, U.S. Army Corps of Engineers.  (Washington, DC: 1993).
 "Where are they now?  A look at former commanders of the Philadelphia District", 1968-1971:  Col. James A. Johnson.  U.S. Army Corps of Engineers, Philadelphia District.

External links

1924 births
2016 deaths
People from Stoughton, Wisconsin
American people of Norwegian descent
University of Wisconsin alumni
United States Army soldiers
Military personnel from Wisconsin
United States Army personnel of World War II
United States Military Academy alumni
United States Army Corps of Engineers personnel
United States Army personnel of the Korean War
Recipients of the Silver Star
Stanford University School of Engineering alumni
United States Army Command and General Staff College alumni
United States Army personnel of the Vietnam War
Dwight D. Eisenhower School for National Security and Resource Strategy alumni
Recipients of the Air Medal
Recipients of the Legion of Merit
United States Army generals
Recipients of the Distinguished Service Medal (US Army)
People from Fairfax Station, Virginia
Burials at West Point Cemetery